Akkuyu is a village in the Besni District, Adıyaman Province, Turkey. The village is populated by Kurds of the Reşwan tribe and had a population of 162 in 2021.

The hamlet of Çakallıyusufağa is attached to the village.

References

Villages in Besni District
Kurdish settlements in Adıyaman Province